Neocollyris multipilosa is a species of ground beetle in the genus Neocollyris in the family Carabidae. It was described by Naviaux in 2003.

References

Multipilosa, Neocollyris
Beetles described in 2003